Kelah Rash-e Pain (also Romanized as Kelah Rash-e Pā’īn; also known as Kalderesh-e Soflá and Kelah Rash-e Soflá) is a village in Shepiran Rural District, Kuhsar District, Salmas County, West Azerbaijan Province, Iran. At the 2006 census, its population was 313, in 53 families.

References 

Populated places in Salmas County